Kenneth Roman (born September 6, 1930 in Boston, Massachusetts) is an American author and advertising executive.

Roman graduated from Dartmouth College in 1952, where he was Editor-in-Chief of the undergraduate daily newspaper.

Roman joined Ogilvy & Mather in 1963 and served as Chairman from 1985 to 1989.  In 1989, WPP plc, a British advertising holding company, acquired the Ogilvy Group for $864 million, which, at the time, was the most ever paid for an advertising agency. David Ogilvy initially resisted the sale, but eventually accepted the title of WPP honorary chairman, a position he relinquished in 1992.

After 26 years with Ogilvy, Roman joined American Express in a senior communications role before becoming a consultant, board director, and author. After his departure Graham Phillips became the chairman and CEO of Ogilvy & Mather Worldwide.

Roman is the co-author of two influentialbusiness books – How to Advertise  and Writing That Works  and the author of a 2009 biography of David Ogilvy entitled The King of Madison Avenue: David Ogilvy and the Making of Modern Advertising. 

He lives in New York City with his wife.

Bibliography
2009 – The King of Madison Avenue: David Ogilvy and the Making of Modern Advertising
2003 – How to Advertise, Third Edition 
2002 – Writing That Works, Third Edition
1997 – How to Advertise, Second Edition 
1992 – Writing That Works, Second Edition
1992 – The New How to Advertise, with Jane Maas
1981 – Writing That Works, with Joel Raphaelson
1977 – How to Advertise, with Jane Maas

References

External links
 www.kennethroman.com

1930 births
Businesspeople from Boston
American marketing people
Living people
Dartmouth College alumni
20th-century American businesspeople
American chief executives
American advertising executives
American business writers
20th-century American biographers
21st-century American biographers